White Bird Hill Summit is a mountain pass in the northwest United States, located in north central Idaho on U.S. Highway 95. In Idaho County, it is midway between White Bird and Grangeville.

The contract for the original road,  from the mouth of White Bird Creek at the Salmon River to Grangeville, was awarded in late 1918. Located to the east, the old road was twice the length and had a multitude of switchbacks ascending a treeless slope.

White Bird Hill Summit marks the divide between the Salmon River and the Camas Prairie.  The Battle of White Bird Canyon of the Nez Perce War occurred in the valley south of the summit in 1877. The summit is named after Chief White Bird, a leader of the Nez Perce tribe.

As far back as the early 1950s, alternatives were proposed; one in 1952 bypassed the summit and Grangeville by continuing down the lower Salmon River another , then climbed Rock Creek to Graves Creek

Video
YouTube video - motorcycle POV - White Bird Hill - northbound US-95 - June 2011
YouTube video - motorcycle trailer POV - White Bird Hill - southbound US-95 - June 2011

References

External links
Visit Idaho.org - official state tourism site
Idaho Transportation Dept. - roadcam - U.S. 95 - White Bird Hill - north of summit
Idaho Transportation Dept. - White Bird Bridge - at base of grade - photo
White Bird Bridge- construction photo gallery from early 1970s 

Mountain passes of Idaho
Landforms of Idaho County, Idaho
Transportation in Idaho County, Idaho
U.S. Route 95